This is the discography of British rock band Ten Years After.

Albums

Studio albums

Live albums

Compilation albums

Box sets

Video albums

Singles

Notes

References

External Links
 

Discographies of British artists
Rock music group discographies